"Ring Ma Bell (What a Wonderful World)" (stylized as RING ma Bell (what a wonderful world)) is a song recorded by South Korean girl group Billlie for their third extended play The Billage of Perception: Chapter Two. It was released as the lead single by Mystic Story on August 31, 2022. It was written by Llano, composed by Sjoerd de Vries, Galeyn Tenhaeff, Catalina Schweighauser while Sjeord also worked on arranging.

Composition and lyrics 
The title song "Ring Ma Bell (What a Wonderful World)" is a hard rock number that starts with a 70's crunchy overdrive guitar riff. The title track was written by Llano, composed by Sjoerd de Vries, Galeyn Tenhaeff, Catalina Schweighauser while Sjeord also worked on arranging. It is written in Korean and English and is composed in the key of F minor, with a tempo of 137 beats per minute with a running time of 3 minutes and 26 seconds.

Background and release 
The track was first announced on August 16 2022, through a track list image released by Mystic Story on different social media platforms. It was first heard on August 30 through a spoiler clip, and the official track was released alongside the EP on August 31, 2022, accompanied by its music video uploaded on YouTube by Mystic Story.

Personnel 
Credits adapted from Melon.

 Sjoerd de Vries – composition, arrangement
 Galeyn Tenhaeff – composition
 Catalina Schweighauser – composition
 Le'mon – lyrics
 Jungsu Peacedelic Han – production
 Kim Ji-hyun – recording engineer
 Seo Yu-duk – recording engineer
 Shin Bong-won (Glob) – mixing engineer
 Junki Hyung-kwon – mixing engineer
 Jun-sung – mixing engineer
 Chris Gehringer – mastering

Charts

Release history

References 

2022 songs
2022 singles
Korean-language songs